John McDonogh Senior High School (nicknamed John Mac) is a public high school in the Mid-City neighborhood of New Orleans, Louisiana, United States. As of 2018, it is a charter school operated by Bricolage Academy. The school is named after John McDonogh (1779 – 1850).

History
It was originally an all-girls school and later a co-educational all-white school, but it was racially integrated after 1967. Of the New Orleans public schools, it once had an academic reputation second only to Benjamin Franklin High School. John McDonogh has a vast sport history, winning district championships in football, baseball, and basketball a combined 83 times in its 109-year history. Prior to Hurricane Katrina it had an average enrollment of 1,200, making it one of the largest high schools per enrollment in Orleans Parish.

John McDonogh became the center of national news when on April 14, 2003, tenth-grade student Jonathan "Caveman" Williams was shot and killed in the school's crowded gymnasium during a physical education class.

In 2010 Paul Vallas, the superintendent of the Recovery School District, said that McDonogh should be converted into a charter school. Some teachers argued against the charter conversion. As of 2010 nobody has filed an application to convert McDonogh. Around 2012, "Future is Now" took over all classes at John McDonogh.

As of February 2013 John McDonogh is featured on a six-episode reality series entitled Blackboard Wars on Oprah Winfrey Network. Sandra Ewell, a woman quoted in an article by WWL-TV, argued "They're calling this school the worst school in America. These children are living up to that. They're giving it very negative connotations. These children have to go to school with that title and that's wrong." The series was originally produced with the intention of showing a school improving under charter school operation.

In March 2014 the Recovery School District announced that McDonogh would be renovated, so the school would close temporarily. When it reopens, Future is Now would not continue operations at the school. Steve Barr, the head of Future is Now, stated that there was simply not enough demand for the school, in that not enough students wanted to attend. Several individuals asked the Louisiana Board of Elementary and Secondary Education (BESE) to return to the school to direct control of New Orleans Public Schools, but the BESE instead voted to let the RSD ask for another charter school operator. Danielle Dreilinger of The Times Picayune wrote that "John Mac has become a flashpoint for tensions over the continuing role of the Recovery system."

In February 2015 Louisiana Civil District Judge Piper Griffin issued a restraining order that prevented RSD from announcing the preferred charter school operator. The decision was still delayed in March of that year. In April 2015 RSD announced that Bricolage Academy, a charter elementary school, would take over the space for McDonogh. Bricolage will be under the authority of the Orleans Parish School Board. KIPP New Orleans had wanted the John Mac campus for its Believe Elementary School but it was turned down in favor of Bricolage.

Reconstruction
On 2016, McDonogh was closed for extensive Renovations, the school reopened in 2017.

Student body
As of 2012 there were 389 students. On October 1, 2013, there were 311 students.

Notable alumni

 Corey Dowden, former NFL player
 Sherman Edgerson, Head Baseball Coach, Ridgeway high school
 DJ Hollygrove- DJ KQBT 93.7 The Beat and member of The Chopstars, producer of ChopNotSlopShow on OVO Sound, Shade 45 mixshow dj, A&R Carl Crawford’s 1501 Ent
 BlaqNMild, Grammy nominated Producer- Nice For What, In My Feelings (Song)
 DJ Blazer Boi Tee (T. Garner)- John Mc Donogh Alumni, Alabama A & M Alumni, Student Mentor, Softball Coach, Asst. Basketball Coach
 Bennie Thompson, former NFL player
 Ron Washington, current 3rd base coach Atlanta Braves current World Series Champs, formerly Texas Rangers manager and former MLB player (Los Angeles Dodgers, Minnesota Twins, Baltimore Orioles, Cleveland Indians, Houston Astros)
 Emanuel Weaver, former NFL player

References

External links

 "John McDonogh Senior High School." Recovery School District.

Charter schools in New Orleans
Public high schools in New Orleans
Educational institutions established in 1902
1902 establishments in Louisiana